Alexander Gallatin McNutt (January 3, 1802 – October 22, 1848) was a Mississippi attorney and politician who served as Governor from 1838 to 1842.

Early life
Alexander G. McNutt was born into an aristocratic landowning family in Rockbridge County, Virginia on January 3, 1802.  He graduated from Washington College (now Washington and Lee University) in 1821, studied law, and moved to Jackson, Mississippi in the early 1820s.  He subsequently relocated to Vicksburg, where he practiced in partnership with Joel Cameron.  When Cameron was murdered by his slaves in 1833, McNutt subsequently married Cameron's widow, Elizabeth Lewis Cameron.  (Before the slaves were executed, a free black man who was also implicated blamed McNutt for the murder, stating that McNutt had instigated it in order to profit by Cameron's death.)

Political career
A Democrat, in 1829 he served as a Selectman in Vicksburg.  In 1835 McNutt was elected to the Mississippi State Senate.  In 1837 he was elected President of the Senate.

McNutt ran successfully for governor in 1837 and served two terms, 1838 to 1842.  During his term Mississippi founded its state library and procured land for construction of a state university, and construction was completed on the state penitentiary.

During his governorship, McNutt opposed central banking, including Mississippi's Planters and Union Banks, in which the state had large ownership stakes, arguing that the stockholders and managers were corrupt.  The banks sold bonds in an effort to raise revenue, which the state repudiated under McNutt's influence, leaving the state with a large debt.

After leaving office he resumed practicing law.  In 1847 he ran unsuccessfully for the United States Senate, losing to Henry S. Foote.

In 1848, McNutt campaigned for the presidential ticket headed by Lewis Cass and was a candidate for presidential elector.  While in Desoto County, he became ill and died on October 22, 1848.  He was buried in Greenwood Cemetery in Jackson, Section 6, Lot 57.

Legacy
McNutt's home is a Vicksburg landmark and listed on the National Register of Historic Places.
The community of McNutt, Mississippi is named in honor of McNutt.

References

External links
 Alexander G. McNutt at National Governors Association
 Alexander G. McNutt at Political Graveyard

Gallery

1802 births
1848 deaths
Democratic Party governors of Mississippi
People from Rockbridge County, Virginia
Politicians from Vicksburg, Mississippi
Washington and Lee University alumni
Democratic Party Mississippi state senators
Mississippi lawyers
19th-century American politicians